Bandarban is a constituency of the Jatiya Sangsad (National Parliament) of Bangladesh, represented, since 1996 June, by Bir Bahadur Ushwe Sing of the Awami League.

Boundaries 
The constituency consists of the entirety of the Bandarban Hill District.

Members of Parliament 

 Note:Chaithoai Roaza contested as Independent politician in 1973

Electoral results

Elections in the 2010s

References 

Bandarban District
Parliamentary constituencies in Bangladesh